Karl Beattie is an English television director, producer and cameraman.  Beattie and wife Yvette Fielding co-own and run Antix Productions.

Career
Karl Beattie's documented life has references to him teaching martial arts within the US. In 2002, Karl Beattie and Yvette Fielding, established their own television production company, Antix Productions. Their first production was Most Haunted for the British TV channel Sky Living, along with a number of spin offs including Most Haunted Live!. In 2006 he created, produced and directed Ghosthunting With..., a paranormal show for ITV2 which features Yvette Fielding leading various celebrities around haunted locations.
In 2008 Karl and Yvette Launched The Paranormal Channel later known as The Unexplained Channel which ran for 2 years.

Controversy
In 2004, Beattie was the subject of media attention when it was claimed he was the only living samurai outside Japan, something he denies, as one of only eight foreigners to have ever been awarded the title. The samurai class was officially abolished in 1868, though Beattie claims that the title lives on in him via his Japanese instructor, Otsu Maeda.

There were claims of showmanship being used in the TV show Most Haunted on Living TV, including the 2015 Most Haunted Live, but the claims have been rejected by Beattie on Twitter. Three days after the live show Beattie staged a reconstruction to explain what some viewers claimed was faked. With his reconstruction, he showed the episode was not faked explaining how the camera cable is attached to his belt to prevent it snagging - a standard procedure in broadcasting

In 2005 the regulator, OFCOM, said a high degree of showmanship that puts it beyond what we believe to be a generally accepted understanding of what comprises a legitimate investigation".

"On balance, we consider that overall Most Haunted/Most Haunted Live should be taken to be a programme produced for entertainment, As such this programme should be seen in the light of shows where techniques are used which mean the audience is not necessarily in full possession of the facts."

Personal life
Karl Beattie met Yvette Fielding while they were working on City Hospital.  They have a daughter Mary, and Karl is stepfather to Yvette's son, Will. They live on a farm in Sandbach, Cheshire. He is a vegetarian and a Freemason.
Karl is also distantly related to Television Presenter Timmy Mallet and Musical Theatre Star Michael Ball.

References

External links
Antix Productions Official Website

Karl Beattie Profile Official Website

British television presenters
British television producers
Living people
1967 births
People from Sandbach